Ballinderry is a civil parish  and townland (of 1182 acres) in County Antrim, Northern Ireland. It is situated in the historic barony of Massereene Upper.

Civil parish of Ballinderry
The civil parish contains the villages of:
Lower Ballinderry
Upper Ballinderry

Townlands
The civil parish contains the following townlands:

A
Aghacarnan, Aghadavy, Aghanamoney, Aghanliss

B
Ballinderry, Ballykelly, Ballylacky, Ballymaclose, Ballymacrevan, Ballyscolly, Brackenhill

C
Cluntirriff, Crew Park

D
Derrykillultagh, Drumanduff

G
Gortrany

K
Kilcreeny

L
Legatirriff, Loughrelisk, Lurganteneil, Lurgill

M
Moneycrumog, Moygarriff

P
Portmore

T
Templecormac, Tullyballydonnell

See also 
List of townlands in County Antrim
List of civil parishes in County Antrim

References

Townlands of County Antrim